Karen Stintz (born November 2, 1971) is a former Canadian politician who represented Ward 16 Eglinton—Lawrence on Toronto City Council from 2003 to 2014 and was the chair of the Toronto Transit Commission (TTC) from 2010 to 2014.

Background
Born and raised in North York, Karen Stintz is a Toronto resident. She went to St. Joseph's Morrow Park Catholic Secondary School.  After receiving a BA from University of Western Ontario, she obtained a Master of Science degree in Journalism from Boston University and worked briefly as a journalist.  Returning to school, she received a Master of Public Administration degree from Queen's University, and was hired by the Ontario Ministry of Health.

Before being elected to council, she acquired seven years of experience in the public and private sectors, managing and delivering multimillion-dollar programs in the healthcare sector.

Her parents are Henry Stintz, a NASA engineer and Barbara Bear. In 1999, she married software executive Darryl Parisien. She and her husband live in the Lawrence Park neighbourhood with their two children.

Political career
In March 2009, Stintz came under some scrutiny when it was revealed that she spent $4,500 of her councillor's office budget on voice lessons. She did so after being told "she speaks too fast and that her message is being lost as a result." She said that the lessons improved her speaking during council meetings.

In 2009, Stintz was one of the leaders of the Responsible Government Group centre-right caucus on City Council which opposed the policies of Mayor David Miller. The group opposed Mayor Miller's handling of the 2009 City Workers’ strike.

As the City Councillor for Ward 16, Stintz initiated and supported a wide array of initiatives to improve the community of Eglinton-Lawrence. To deter graffiti, Ward 16's youth were recruited to create murals in the Anne Rawson Laneway, Duplex Parkette and Eglinton Park field house. When a development was proposed at 1717 Avenue Road, urban design guidelines were created. This established the framework needed for constructive dialogue for development in the community. By supporting Orchard View Pedestrian Square, Stintz not only assisted in bringing increased pedestrian safety to a dangerous intersection, but found a new home for the local farmers market. This Square has received "overwhelming positive support". With the "Can the Trash Contest", students from schools across the ward were asked to create posters that illustrated the various reasons for why we should all "can the trash." When disagreements arose from the use of public spaces, Stintz played an active role in resolving the issues. This included finding equitable ice time for those who use the ice rinks in North Toronto, finding space for dog owners to walk their dogs off-leash in a way that did not interfere with other residents  and being part of the revitalization of the parks in Ward 16.

In April 2009, Stintz accused Mayor David Miller of lying during a debate about payroll costs. Miller said "I know a group of you went up to see the minister and... asked for a $25,000 grant in order to study political parties in the city of Toronto,". Stintz retorted, "I'm actually shocked that you would... so blatantly lie,". Stintz later produced a document addressed to Municipal Affairs Minister Jim Watson and titled, Next Steps for the Strong Mayor Model in the Toronto Context. A spokesman for the minister said the request was for a "study of city hall governance that would have included a look at political parties."

Chair of the Toronto Transit Commission

In 2010, Stintz was appointed to the position as chair of the Toronto Transit Commission with the support of  Mayor Rob Ford.

During her time as chair, the TTC introduced a "Customer Charter" which included: posting performance reports on TTC surface routes, an annual TTC Town Hall, 6 Twitter Town Halls per year and 5 "Meet the Manager" events where customers can engage with senior TTC staff. As Chair, 153 articulated buses were added to the fleet  and new subway cars were placed on the Yonge-University-Spadina line. Customer service operating hours were extended to make assistance available 7 days a week from 7am-10pm. A new position of "TTC Station Manager" was created to improve accountability to customers  while more next vehicle arrival screens and debit and credit card payment systems were made available. In addition, a suicide prevention program was launched with the help of Toronto Distress Centres and Bell Canada  and she oversaw the approval of Presto's introduction to the TTC. The TTC also began the introduction of WiFi services in its stations.

During her time as chair, the TTC also approved a number of measures to improve the commission's fiscal imbalance. The TTC made decisions to balance its budget while also reducing the government subsidy received by 10%. This included a process to realign services to match revenue and negotiating new fuel contracts to save the TTC $23.5 million between 2010-2012 and an estimated $30 million from 2013–2014. By agreeing to a new benefits package, and reducing administrative staff, an additional $18.5 million was saved while Stintz served as Chair. By successfully contracting out bus and washroom cleaning services and leasing the Toronto Coach Terminal, a further $4.9 million was saved.

Restructuring TTC Board 

Stintz successfully moved a motion in March 2012 at City Council to remove 5 City councillors from the TTC Board,  who were all Rob Ford supporters,( Vincent Crisanti, Frank Di Giorgio, Norm Kelly, Cesar Palacio and Denzil Minnan-Wong ). The 5 councillors, who constituted  a majority of the TTC Board, had  voted to terminate the services of the TTC General Manager Gary Webster.

Toronto City Council expanded the TTC Board in 2012,  on Stintz' recommendation,  from nine councillors to an 11-member body with seven councillors plus four citizen members.

Undercover Boss

Concerned about budget cuts and negative public perception of the TTC, Stintz revealed on an episode of the show Undercover Boss that aired February 16, 2012 on W Network that she had gone undercover at the TTC for a week in 2011. Changing her appearance and posing as "Ruth Bear", a newly hired TTC trainee, she shadowed a subway train operator, an upholsterer, a station caretaker, and a night shift bus serviceperson, trying each of their respective jobs (for the subway operator, she used a simulator instead). Afterward, she revealed her true identity to those employees, that she understood and valued their work, and their ideas on how TTC riders could help them. She had hoped to gain an idea what could be cut and what should not be, and saw the front-line employees as the best source.

2014 mayoral race

On October 27, 2013, Stintz announced that she would run for mayor in 2014. She said, "I believe in the fiscal agenda of Rob Ford, but I worry that another four years of Rob Ford may not move the city forward. And I want to continue to build our city." After stepping down as TTC chair in February, registered as a candidate on February 24, 2014. The Karen Stintz campaign will focus on fighting congestion, creating safe neighbourhoods and building strong communities. Some of her proposals are a "downtown relief subway line, reform the land transfer tax, [and] a joint Toronto-U.S. bid for the 2026 World Cup and explore a 'hybrid' solution for the eastern part of the Gardiner Expressway." On August 21, 2014 Stintz announced she was dropping out of the race and would not seek re-election as city councillor.

Post-political career
In late August 2014, after withdrawing from the mayoral election, Stintz expressed interest in becoming Commissioner of the Canadian Football League when the position was to become vacant in April 2015. When this opportunity did not pan out, Stintz was appointed as the Executive Director of ArtsBuild Ontario – a nonprofit arts service organization dedicated to realizing long-term solutions for building, managing and financing sustainable arts facilities needed in Ontario communities. In November 2015, Stintz was named Variety Village President and CEO for an 18-month term.  She remains in that capacity as of September 2021.

References

External links

Karen Stintz for Mayor of Toronto - 2014 Toronto Mayoral Collection - Web Archive created by the University of Toronto Libraries

Living people
Women municipal councillors in Canada
Toronto city councillors
Women in Ontario politics
Boston University College of Communication alumni
Queen's University at Kingston alumni
University of Western Ontario alumni
People from North York
1970 births
Chairs of the Toronto Transit Commission